Des gaffes et des dégâts, written and drawn by Franquin, is the sixth album of the original Gaston Lagaffe series.  The 59 strips of this album were previously published in Spirou magazine.

Story
In this album, Bertrand Labévue and the Gaffophone appear for the first time. Most of the gags are caused by the instrument.

Inventions
filter for gases: to be placed on the exhaust pipe of one's car to prevent CO2 emissions
a rocket to modify the weather: rocket full of explosive, but inefficient
quick floor polisher: consists of an old fire extinguisher.
table : a table camping which can fold automatically, thank to a small button situated at the center of the table, which can cause some unexpected and accidents

Background
This is the first Gaston Lagaffe album published in the usual Franco-Belgian album format (21,8 x 30 cm).

References

 Gaston Lagaffe classic series on the official website
 Publication in Spirou on bdoubliées.com.

External links
Official website 

1968 graphic novels
Comics by André Franquin